This is a list of episodes from the ninth season of Columbo.

Episodes

References

Columbo 09
1989 American television seasons
1990 American television seasons
The ABC Mystery Movie